Krakken Mountain is a mountain  north of Sandseten Mountain and just northwest of Gneysovaya Peak in the Westliche Petermann Range of the Wohlthat Mountains, Antarctica. It was discovered and plotted from air photos by the Third German Antarctic Expedition, 1938–39, was replotted from air photos and surveys by the Sixth Norwegian Antarctic Expedition, 1956–60, and named Krakken (the stool).

References

Mountains of Queen Maud Land
Princess Astrid Coast